Frank Twyman  (17 November 1876 – 6 March 1959) was a British designer of optical instruments and co-inventor of the Twyman–Green interferometer.

Early life 
Twyman was born in Canterbury, Kent, England on 17 November 1876, the seventh child of nine to Jane Lefevre and ropemaker George Edmund Twyman. He attended Simon Langton School before doing an electrical engineering course at Finsbury Technical College, followed by a Siemens scholarship at Central Technical College in London. In 1897 he co-authored his first scientific paper.

Career 
Twyman worked briefly for the Fowler Waring Cables Company testing telephone cables, before beginning work in 1898 for optical instrument manufacturing firm Adam Hilger as an assistant to Otto Hilger. Following the death of Otto Hilger, Twyman became managing director of the firm. He remained in post until 1946 when he became chairman.

Until 1910 he managed the design and construction of all of the firms new equipment. This included a deviation wavelength spectrometer and a spectrograph made using quartz rather than glass to enable the observation of the ultraviolet spectrum.

Between 1918 and 1923 with foreman Alfred Green he developed the Twyman–Green interferometer, based on the Michelson interferometer, and used principally for testing optical equipment.

In 1924 he was elected a fellow of the Royal Society. In 1926 he was awarded both the Duddell Medal of the Physical Society and the John Price Wetherill Medal of the Franklin Institute.

In 1942 he published the book Prism and Lens Making. In 1956 he won the Gold medal of the Society for Applied Spectroscopy.

He also advised the firm E. R. Watts and Son until they merged in 1948 with Adam Hilger Ltd. to form Hilger & Watts Ltd. He remained an advisor to Hilger & Watts until his death.

Personal life 
In 1906 Twyman married Phillipine Katherine Elisabeth Hilger, daughter of Otto Hilger. They went on to have four children together. In 1956 he authored a book on his family history, An East Kent Family. He also wrote a pamphlet of his views on economics, and a book on apprenticeships.

He died at home on 6 March 1959 in St Pancras, London.

Books

References 

Optical engineers
1876 births
1959 deaths
People from Canterbury
Fellows of the Royal Society
Fellows of the Institute of Physics